Legal is the second studio album by American rapper Special Ed. It was released on July 19, 1990 via Profile Records. Recording sessions took place at Howie's Crib in New York. Production was handled by Howie Tee, Wayne Archer and Special Ed himself. It features guest appearances from 40-Love, Akshun, Coolie Man, Drew Archer and Little Shawn. Two singles were released from the album, "Come On, Let's Move It" and "The Mission". It peaked at number 84 on the Billboard 200 albums chart in the United States.

Track listing

Charts

References

External links

1990 albums
Special Ed albums
Profile Records albums
Albums produced by Howie Tee